Krasny Klyuch is a rural locality (a village) in Iglinsky Selsoviet, Iglinsky District, Bashkortostan, Russia. The population was 54 as of 2010. There are 3 streets.

Geography 
Krasny Klyuch is located 6 km northwest of Iglino (the district's administrative centre) by road. Iglino is the nearest rural locality.

References 

Rural localities in Iglinsky District